The Convergence of Democrats of Navarre (CDN), also referred to as Navarrese Democratic Convergence, was a regionalist political party of the Spanish autonomous community of Navarre that split from Navarrese People's Union (UPN) in the 1990s, after this party became part of the conservative pan-Spanish People's Party. The break-away faction gathered around the figure of Juan Cruz Alli, former President of Navarre.

Between 2003 and 2009, CDN was part of the coalition government of Navarre, together with UPN. In the regional elections held in May 2011, it lost the two seats kept in the Parliament of Navarre, and the party broke up.

Election results

Parliament of Navarre

References

External links
 Official webpage

Regionalist parties in Spain
Political parties established in 1995
Political parties disestablished in 2011
Political parties in Navarre